The NanoSat MO Framework (NMF) is a software framework for nanosatellites based on CCSDS Mission Operations services.
It was developed by Graz University of Technology in partnership with the  European Space Agency. The framework facilitates the monitoring and control of the nanosatellite software applications as well as the interaction with the nanosatellite platform. This is achieved by using the latest CCSDS standards for monitoring and control, and by exposing services for common peripherals among nanosatellite platforms. Furthermore, it is capable of managing the software on-board by exposing a set of services for software management.

Installed apps onboard can be started and stopped from ground via the NMF. Apps can retrieve data from the nanosatellite platform through a set of platform services. Additionally, it includes CCSDS standardized services for monitoring and control of apps. An NMF App can be developed, distributed, and deployed on a spacecraft.

There is a Software Development Kit (SDK) in order to facilitate the development of software based on the NanoSat MO Framework. NMF Apps are written in Java (programming language) and have Apache Maven as a prerequisite. The project's source code and several release versions are available via GitHub.

A CubeSat simulator that can provide telemetry data as well as GPS and ADCS information is included with the NMF. Mission planning services will be included in future releases. , they are still under development.

The reference implementation of the NanoSat MO Framework will be used in ESA's OPS-SAT mission, an in-orbit laboratory mission specifically designed to test new software.

Architecture specifications 

The NanoSat MO Framework is built upon the CCSDS Mission Operations services Architecture and therefore it inherits its properties such as being transport-agnostic, multi-domain, and programming language independent. Additionally, it is independent from any specific nanosatellite platform.

The software framework includes five sets of MO services. The first three are Standardized by the CCSDS and the other two are bespoke interfaces:
COM services
Common services
Monitor and Control services
Platform services
Software Management services

The NanoSat MO Framework is split in two segments. First, the “Ground Segment” just like in any traditional spacecraft system. Second, the “NanoSat Segment” which is the equivalent of the space segment but because the target of the framework are nanosatellites, it contains a more specialized name. An NMF Composite is a software component that consists of interconnected services specialized for a certain purpose and to be deployed on the NanoSat segment or Ground segment. The NMF Composites are based on SOA’s service composability design principle that encourages reusing existing services and combine them together to build an advanced solution.
The naming convention for the NMF Composites is: <Segment> MO <Purpose>.

The defined set of NMF Composites are:
NanoSat MO Monolithic
NanoSat MO Supervisor
NanoSat MO Connector
Ground MO Adapter
Ground MO Proxy

The objective of the NMF Composites is to provide prebuilt components that allow quick development of new software solutions that are interoperable in end-to-end scenarios.

The NanoSat MO Framework defines an NMF App as an on-board software application based on the NanoSat MO Framework. An NMF App can be developed by integrating the NanoSat MO Connector component into the software application. NMF Apps are expected to be started, monitored, stopped, and/or killed by the NanoSat MO Supervisor component.

Reference implementation in Java 

The reference implementation provides a concrete implementation of the specifications of the NanoSat MO Framework in the Java programming language. It was used to discover problems, errors and ambiguities in the interfaces. The implementation is mature and the first version is available online.

This reference implementation also serves as the basis for the tools of the Software Development Kit which can be used by other developers.

The reference implementation in Java is currently maintained by the European Space Agency and it is available online for free (on GitHub) under the open-source European Space Agency Public License.

NMF SDK 
The NanoSat MO Framework Software Development Kit (NMF SDK) is a set of development tools and software source code that facilitate the creation of applications with the NanoSat MO Framework.

It is composed of:
Demos for NMF Ground software development
Demos of NMF Apps
Consumer Test Tool (CTT)
NMF Package Assembler
NMF Playground (with a satellite simulator)
Documentation
The NMF SDK is the starting point for a software developer willing to develop applications with the NMF.

NMF Missions 
An NMF Mission is a concrete implementation of the NanoSat MO Framework for a specific mission. The NMF Mission development includes activities such as implementing the Platform services and the NanoSat MO Supervisor for the specific platform. If a custom or tailored transport is used for the mission, then the transport binding must be implemented and additionally, integrated with the Ground MO Proxy for protocol bridging.

The following NMF Mission implementations were implemented: Software Simulator, and OPS-SAT.

Software Simulator 

The Software Simulator was developed to be part of the NMF SDK in order to provide simulated data towards the NMF Apps during the development and testing phases.

OPS-SAT 

An implementation for ESA's OPS-SAT mission was developed in order to validate the software framework in-flight. OPS-SAT is a CubeSat built by the European Space Agency (ESA) and launched in December 2019, and it is intended to demonstrate the improvements in mission control capabilities that will arise when satellites can fly more powerful on-board computers. For example, OPS-SAT experimenters can use the NMF SDK for quick development of software capable of running on ground and/or in space. The NanoSat MO Framework apps are able to publish telemetry, receive telecommands or access the GPS device on OPS-SAT.

References

External links

Consultative Committee for Space Data Systems (CCSDS) at http://www.ccsds.org

Spaceflight technology
European Space Agency
Free software programmed in Java (programming language)
Java development tools